Pridvorica (in Serbian Cyrillic ) is a village in Serbia located in the municipality of Blace and the district of Toplica. In 2002, it had 124 inhabitants, all Serbs.

In 1948, the village had 491 inhabitants, en 1981 253 et, en 1991, 201.

Notes

External links 
 Satellite view of Pridvorica

Populated places in Toplica District